The Prospect of Whitby is a historic public house on the banks of the Thames at Wapping in the London Borough of Tower Hamlets. It lays claim to being the site of the oldest riverside tavern, dating from around 1520.

History
The tavern was formerly known as The Pelican and later as the Devil’s Tavern, on account of its dubious reputation. All that remains from the building's earliest period is the 400-year-old stone floor, and the pub features eighteenth century panelling and a nineteenth century facade. The pub has a pewter-top bar, and is decorated with many nautical objects. In former times it was a meeting place for sailors, smugglers, cut-throats and footpads. Sir Hugh Willoughby sailed from here in 1553 in a disastrous attempt to discover the North-East Passage to China.

In the 17th century, it became the hostelry of choice of "Hanging" Judge Jeffreys, scourge of the Monmouth Rebellion. He lived nearby and a replica gallows and noose hangs by the Thameside window, commemorating his custom. He was chased by anti-Royalists into the nearby Town of Ramsgate, captured and taken to the Tower for his own safety. According to John Stow it was "The usual place for hanging of pirates and sea-rovers, at the low-water mark, and there to remain till three tides had overflowed them". Execution Dock was actually by Wapping Old Stairs and generally used for pirates. In the eighteenth century, the first fuchsia plant in the United Kingdom was sold at the pub.

Views from the pub were sketched by both Turner and Whistler. 

Following a fire in the early 19th century, the tavern was rebuilt and renamed The Prospect of Whitby, after a Tyne collier that used to berth next to the pub. The ship took sea coal from Newcastle upon Tyne to London. The Prospect was listed as a Grade II listed building in December 1950. The pub underwent a renovation in 1951 to double the interior space. In January 1953, the pub was raided by armed robbers. The pub has been visited by Princess Margaret and Prince Rainier III of Monaco.

On the opposite side of the road (Wapping Wall) is the Wapping Hydraulic Power Station, later an arts centre and restaurant.

In popular culture

The video for Gilbert O'Sullivan's 1970 hit Nothing Rhymed was shot here as he was living close by in a bedsit when he wrote the song.

The public house features briefly in an episode of Only Fools And Horses. When Uncle Albert goes missing in one episode, Del Boy and Rodney travel around London looking for him. Nicholas Lyndhurst is shown in one scene walking out of the pub. There is also a scene from the 1956 film D-Day the Sixth of June starring Robert Taylor and Richard Todd where Taylor's character is seen with Dana Wynter's character having drinks together during the Second World War in London.

In the comic book The League of Extraordinary Gentlemen, Mina Harker pauses in front of the public house and says it brings back memories. She is referring to the beaching of the Demeter at Whitby in the novel Dracula.

This pub is also featured in Vercors'''s novel Les Animaux dénaturés (translated variously into English as You Shall Know Them, Borderline, and The Murder of the Missing Link).

The pub also appears in Whitechapel, Series 4, Episode 4, where the body of a victim is discovered on the Thames shoreline. DS Miles briefly explains its history to DI Chandler.

The pub also serves as the location for a scene in D-Day the Sixth of June (1956) and the final scenes in The Old Guard'' (2020).

See also
 Town of Ramsgate
 List of restaurants in London
 Watermen's stairs
 The Grapes, Limehouse

References

External links 

 Pubs.com information

Grade II listed buildings in the London Borough of Tower Hamlets
Pubs in the London Borough of Tower Hamlets
Restaurants in London
History of the London Borough of Tower Hamlets
Buildings and structures on the River Thames
Tourist attractions in the London Borough of Tower Hamlets
Grade II listed pubs in London
16th-century establishments in England
Wapping